Daniel Graeme Shurben (born 10 November 1983) is an English cricketer.  Shurben is a left-handed batsman.  He was born in Sunderland, County Durham.

Shurben made his debut for Northumberland in the 2004 Minor Counties Championship against Suffolk.  Shurben has played Minor counties cricket for Northumberland from 2004 to present, which has included 21 Minor Counties Championship matches and 23 MCCA Knockout Trophy matches.  He made his only List A appearance against Middlesex in the 2005 Cheltenham & Gloucester Trophy.  In this match he scored 37 runs before being dismissed by Jamie Dalrymple.

He also played Second XI cricket for the Durham Second XI.

References

External links
Daniel Shurben at ESPNcricinfo
Daniel Shurben at CricketArchive

1983 births
Living people
Cricketers from Sunderland
English cricketers
Northumberland cricketers